Bettié is a town in south-eastern Ivory Coast. It is a sub-prefecture of and seat of Bettié Department in Indénié-Djuablin Region, Comoé District. Bettié is also a commune. The town lies on the east bank of the river that forms the boundary between Comoé and Lagunes Districts.
In 2014, the population of the sub-prefecture of Bettié was 24,983.

Villages
The ten villages of the sub-prefecture of Bettié and their population in 2014 are:

References

Sub-prefectures of Indénié-Djuablin
Communes of Indénié-Djuablin